Frank Stauffacher (1917 – 24 July 1955, in San Francisco, California) was an American experimental filmmaker, best known for directing the cinema series "Art in Cinema" at the San Francisco Museum of Modern Art from 1946 to 1954.

He was the cinematographer for Mother's Day (1948) and Adventures of Jimmy (1950), two films by James Broughton. His brother, Jack Stauffacher, is a well-known printer and typeface creator. On December 18, 2013, Notes on the Port of St. Francis was selected for the Library of Congress's National Film Registry.

From November 1948 until his death at age 38 from a brain tumor, Stauffacher was married to graphic artist Barbara Stauffacher Solomon.

Stauffacher's short film Zigzag was preserved by the Academy Film Archive in 2013.

Selected filmography
Sausalito (1948) impressionistic film of Sausalito, California
Zigzag (1948) color film of neon signs
Notes on the Port of St. Francis (1951) with narration by Robert Louis Stevenson read by Vincent Price

Bibliography
Frank Stauffacher, Art in Cinema (San Francisco: Society for Art in Cinema, 1947) first edition
Barbara Stauffacher Solomon, Memoir of North Beach, SF and Frank Stauffacher n Zyzzyva magazine

References

External links

1917 births
1955 deaths
American experimental filmmakers
Deaths from brain cancer in the United States
Deaths from cancer in California